Julie-Anne Gross (born 27 September 1967) is a French fencer. She competed in the women's team foil event at the 1992 Summer Olympics.

References

External links
 

1967 births
Living people
French female foil fencers
Olympic fencers of France
Fencers at the 1992 Summer Olympics
Sportspeople from Neuilly-sur-Seine